The Keokuk County Courthouse  located in Sigourney, Iowa, United States, was built in 1911. It was individually listed on the National Register of Historic Places in 1981 as a part of the County Courthouses in Iowa Thematic Resource. In 1999 it was included as a contributing property in the Public Square Historic District. The courthouse is the fourth building the county has used for court functions and county administration.

History
Keokuk County built its first courthouse in Sigourney in 1845 for $218.  The  building, which was constructed of logs, also housed the jail and served as a schoolhouse, public hall, and hotel. Lancaster became the county seat in the late 1840s and a two-story frame courthouse was built there in 1848 for $699. By the mid-1850s the county seat was back in Sigourney. A new courthouse was built in 1858 for $17,200. It was remodeled over the years until the present courthouse was begun in 1909. It was completed two years later at a cost of $150,000.

Architecture
The building was designed in the Classical Revival style by the Des Moines architectural firm Wetherell & Gage, and built by J.L Simmons. The Columbian Exposition of 1893 in Chicago influenced the design of the building. The Bedford limestone structure rests on a raised basement level. Each facade features a frontispiece with large engaged columns in the Ionic order that are set in antis above first floor level. It is capped by a clock tower and cupola. Other historic structures on the courthouse square include a fountain, bandstand, and a Civil War Monument. The significance of the courthouse is derived from its association with county government, and the political power and prestige of Sigourney as the county seat.

References

External links

Government buildings completed in 1911
Sigourney, Iowa
Neoclassical architecture in Iowa
National Register of Historic Places in Keokuk County, Iowa
Individually listed contributing properties to historic districts on the National Register in Iowa
Courthouses on the National Register of Historic Places in Iowa
County courthouses in Iowa
Clock towers in Iowa
1911 establishments in Iowa